The 1935–36 1re série season was the 20th season of the 1re série, the top level of ice hockey in France. Français Volants won their first championship.

Tournament

Semifinal
 Stade Français - Chamonix Hockey Club 4:2 OT

Final
 Français Volants - Stade Français 3:2/7:5

External links
Season on hockeyarchives.info

Fra
1935–36 in French ice hockey
Ligue Magnus seasons